Raja Biru or Ratu Biru (c. 1566–1624) ruled the Sultanate of Patani (1616–1624), succeeding her sister Raja Hijau.  She was the second of three daughters of Sultan Mansur Shah who ruled the country.  She was succeeded by her sister Raja Ungu.  In Malay, her name means "Blue" or "Blue Queen."

Reign
Raja Biru was around 50 when she became queen in 1616. During her reign, Patani faced increasing threats from the Siamese. In response to the threats, she was said to have ordered a man of Chinese descent named Tok Kayan to create three large cannons. One of these Phaya Tani was later seized by the Siamese and is now located in Bangkok.  Raja Biru persuaded the Kelantan Sultanate in the south to become incorporated into Patani.

Raja Biru died in 1624. She was succeeded by her younger sister Raja Ungu who was married to the Sultan of Pahang and had return from Pahang after her husband died.

References 

 A. Teeuw & D. K. Wyatt. Hikayat Patani: The Story of Patani. Bibliotheca Indonesica, 5. The Hague: Martinus Nijhoff, 1970.
 Ahmad Fathy al-Fatani. Pengantar Sejarah Patani. Alor Setar: Pustaka Darussalam, 1994.
 Wayne A. Bougas. The Kingdom of Patani: Between Thai and Malay Mandalas. Occasional Paper on the Malay World, no. 12. Selangor: Institut Alam dan Tamadun Melayu, Universiti Kebangsaan Malaysia, 1994.

1624 deaths
History of Pattani
17th-century women rulers
Sultans
Thai people of Malay descent
Year of birth unknown